The 1955 Kentucky gubernatorial election was held on November 7, 1955. Democratic nominee Happy Chandler defeated Republican nominee Edwin R. Denney with 58.02% of the vote.

Primary elections
Primary elections were held on August 6, 1955.

Democratic primary

Candidates
Happy Chandler, former United States Senator
Bert Combs, Judge of the Kentucky Court of Appeals
Jesse N. R. Cecil

Results

Republican primary

Candidates
Edwin R. Denney, former United States Attorney for the Eastern District of Kentucky
James L. Clay

Results

General election

Candidates
Major party candidates
Happy Chandler, Democratic
Edwin R. Denney, Republican 

Other candidates
Robert H. Garrison, Prohibition
Jesse K. Lewis, Independent

Results

References

1955
Kentucky
Gubernatorial
November 1955 events in the United States